Antonina is a municipality in the state of Paraná in southern Brazil. As of 2020, the estimated population was 18,949.

Geography
It is 80 km away from Curitiba.

The municipality contains 29% of the  Roberto Ribas Lange State Park, created in 1994. It contains part of the  Pico Paraná State Park, created in 2002.
It also holds 30% of the  Bom Jesus Biological Reserve, a strictly protected conservation unit established in 2012.

History
The small town Antonina was former known as “Capela” – as a chapel has been built there in the 18th century. Due to this fact the inhabitants are called “capelistas” until today. The official name is in honor to King Antonio of Portugal.

Culture
Antonina hosts a July winter festival promoted by the Federal University of Paraná, which develops several workshops and shows during this time in the village. The carnival takes place within several blocks and features samba groups.

See also 

 Port of Antonina

References

External links

 INFORMAÇÃO DO MUNICÍPIO

Municipalities in Paraná